Pseudotrapelus aqabensis is a species of Agama native to southern Jordan, Egypt (Sinai), Israel, and potentially northwestern Saudi Arabia.

Etymology  
The binomial name, aqabensis, is named after the location in which the holotype was found, Aqaba.

References 

Reptiles described in 2012
aqabensis
Taxa named by Daniel Andreevich Melnikov
Taxa named by Roman A. Nazarov
Taxa named by Natalia B. Ananjeva